El Hombre Que Más Te Amó (The man that most loves you) is the 81st studio album released by Mexican singer Vicente Fernández on 5 October 2010 by Sony BMG.

Track listing

Charts

Weekly charts

Year-end charts

Sales and certifications

See also
 List of number-one Billboard Latin Albums from the 2010s

References

External links
  official website Vicente Fernández
 [] El Hombre Que Mas Te Amó on allmusic.com
  El Hombre Que Mas Te Amó on itunes.apple.com

2010 albums
Vicente Fernández albums
Spanish-language albums
Sony BMG Norte albums
Latin Grammy Award for Best Ranchero/Mariachi Album